Maurício José Ferreira da Costa de Abreu (born Coimbra, 19 April 1954) is a Portuguese photographer, editor and cultural producer. He is a leading name in Portuguese photography, as a specialist in the areas of natural and cultural patrimony, ethnography and traditional architecture.

Biography
He was born in Coimbra but lives in Setúbal region since 1964. A graduated in Electrical Engineering by the Instituto Superior Técnico, of Lisbon, since 1978, he became a professional photographer in 1983. He has since then developed several projects as a photographer, producer and editor, always with the main concern of register through photography a series of values that tend to be menaced by the modern civilization.

He is the author and editor of a large number of books dedicated to several aspects of Portuguese culture and regions, with texts by writers and journalists like José Manuel Fernandes, Álamo de Oliveira, Francisco José Viegas, Nuno Júdice and João de Melo. He was the photographer of José Saramago's travel book, Viagem a Portugal (Travel to Portugal), in 1990, which details a trip taken by the writer to the entire territory of Mainland Portugal.

He was elected QEP (Qualified European Photographer) by the FEP (European National Professional Photographers Associations) in Belgium, in 2009.

Works published

Personal projects
 O Homem e o Mar - O Litoral Português (1987), text by José Manuel Fernandes
 Açores (1987), text by Álamo de Oliveira
 Comboios Portugueses - Um Guia Sentimental (1987), text by Francisco José Viegas
 Nas Margens de Um Rio (1988), text by Francisco José Viegas
 Rios de Portugal (1990), text by José Manuel Fernandes
 São Miguel - Açores (1992), text by João de Melo
 Madeira - Porto Santo (1993), text by Vicente Jorge Silva
 Serras de Portugal (1994), text by José Manuel Fernandes
 Algarve (1995), text by Nuno Júdice
 O Ar, a Terra, a Água - Um Cântico Votivo (1996), text by Francisco José Viegas
 Ribatejo (1997), text by Hélder Pinho
 Norte Alentejano (1999), text by José Manuel Fernandes
 Retratos do Fim do Século (2000), text by António Barreto
 Alentejo (2002), text by Hélder Pinho
 Rio Douro - Da Nascente à Foz (2004), text by several authors
 Açores (2005), text by several authors
 Beira Litoral - Aveiro e Coimbra (2006), text by several authors
 Minho (2007), text by several authors

Projects by editors invitation
 Quintas e Palácios nos Arredores de Lisboa (1986), text by Anne de Stoop
 Terras do Norte na Literatura Portuguesa (1990), text by Luís Forjaz Trigueiros
 Viagem a Portugal (1990), travel book by José Saramago
 Terras da Beira na Literatura Portuguesa (1991), text by António Manuel Couto Viana
 Douro (1993), with Emílio Biel and Domingos Alvão, text by António Barreto
 Artesãos e Artesanato (1993), text by Isabel Victor and Luís Gonçalves
 As Beiras (1994), text by Jaime Cortesão
 Festas, Feiras e Romarias (1997), text by Fernando António Baptista Pereira, Ana Duarte and Luís Gonçalves
 Praias de Portugal (1997), text by Alice Vieira
 Albufeiras de Portugal (2000), text by António Carmona Rodrigues
 Lendas dos Açores (2007), text by José Viale Moutinho
 Lendas de Trás-os-Montes e Alto Douro (2007), text by José Viale Moutinho

References

External links
Maurício Abreu Official Website

1954 births
Living people
Portuguese editors
Portuguese photographers
People from Coimbra